Sinopora may refer to:
 Sinopora (cnidarian), a fossil genus of cnidarians in the family Sinoporidae
 Sinopora (plant), a genus of plants in the family Lauraceae